Cardinalis is a genus of cardinal in the family Cardinalidae. There are three species ranging across the Great Lakes region to northern South America.

Description
They are birds between 19 and 22 cm in length. Its most distinctive characteristics are the presence of a conspicuous crest and a thick and strong conical bill. There is sexual dimorphism; males have a greater amount of red in their plumage, and females have only some tints, with a predominance of gray. Immature individuals are similar to females.

Species

References

External links
 
 

 
Bird genera
Taxa named by Charles Lucien Bonaparte
Taxonomy articles created by Polbot